Wildlife Messengers is a 501(c)(3) nonprofit organization with the purpose of making scientific and educational films, photographs, and audio recordings to promote nature conservation, mainly in countries with lower industrial bases, and to distribute them to national and international audiences. The targeted audiences include government authorities, elementary and middle schools, local indigenous communities, and non-governmental organizations. The organization was started in 2017, after the founding scientists recognized the need for a stronger connection between academic research and public outreach, and a scientific input from nature conservation to filmmaking. Evaluating and publishing the impact of conservation films are among the goals of the non-profit. The directors have been also publishing in scientific peer-reviewed journals about global effects of habitat destruction to parrots, a flu-like illness transmission among wild bonobos, and effective population size estimates of swift parrots. The organization has produced several video abstracts to scientific studies including the population genetics of swift parrots, mowing for biodiversity, the global journey of storks, and the parrots of Oceania.

History 

Before the establishment of Wildlife Messengers, all three co-founders had experiences with connecting media and conservation. They realized that there is a bridge between the scientific work and active conservation activities. Knowledge from scientific research should be conveyed not only to other scientists but also to general audiences and to decision makers in an understandable way. The first common project by Cintia Garai and George Olah was The Macaw Project documentary. This film was translated into many languages (including Spanish, Portuguese, German, Polish, Hungarian), screened in many different countries, and gained much public attention. Through recognizing the power of scientific documentaries and photography, and the effect each has on the broader public, and grounded on their common interest in wildlife conservation using scientific tools and the power of media, Cintia Garai, George Olah, and Robert Carrubba established the non-profit corporation Wildlife Messengers in 2017.

Principles 

Wildlife Messengers has the following code of conduct:

 Choosing ‘the right’ projects. Film projects are chosen based on their importance for conservation and whether a resultant film can actually contribute to decision making and protection. Many of the projects take place in countries with lower industrial bases and concern topics that are not considered ‘profitable’ by mainstream media.

 Scientific approach. When starting a project, thorough scientific background research is always conducted by reviewing the latest academic and environmental literature surrounding the topic, and by liaising with experts, local communities, decision makers, and other organizations. The aim is to understand as many aspects of a project's contexts as possible.

 Communicative conservation approach. The chosen projects are most in need of urgent conservation actions. The aim is to engage and educate viewers about facts and possible solutions surrounding these topics. Films need communicate the conservation facts interestingly.

 Inclusion of local communities. The participation of local communities is always prioritized during the preparation, filming, and postproduction stages of a project. Collaborative capacity building is one of the goals because it is the local communities that are the most impacted by conservation issues and decisions and their acts affect nature conservation in a direct way.

 Topic-appropriate filmography. To transmit the messages of local conservation issues, modern filming techniques are used to deliver great video quality, while videos taken by local people are also advocated. There are times when local footage obtained from a cell phone camera fits the goals better than arriving with a film crew. The aim is to document, but to not disturb.

 Targeting audiences. Messages are targeted and tailored to specific audiences, be it local communities, students, NGOs, or decision makers. The motivation and knowledge of an audience are considered, and also the message hoped to convey. When appropriate, different versions of a film are made to reach different audiences.

Filmography

The Indonesian Parrot Project (2019) 
The Indonesian Parrot Project (IPP) has been conducting important conservation work to save parrots and cockatoos from extinction in Indonesia. The film shows the history and current work of IPP, the challenges of parrot conservation in Indonesia, and the importance of protecting parrots as flagship species. We zig-zag around the Indonesian archipelago following local researchers to show their work in action. We travel to the remote island of Masakambing to see the collaboration with local people looking after the last remaining population of the Abbotti cockatoo, to the Moluccas to observe the parrot rehabilitation and release center of IPP, and to the Komodo island to reveal how the famous dragons contribute to the conservation of a critically endangered cockatoo species. In the documentary we examine all aspects of parrot conservation including the roles and responsibilities of conservationists, decision makers, local communities and eco-tourists, demonstrating that success can be achieved only by well-organized cooperation among them.

The Macaw Kingdom (2018)

Expedition Edition 
In February, 2016 the nine members of an international scientific expedition finally got onboard of an Amazonian motorised canoe. It took 4 days for them to reach the location. After setting up their base camp in the rainforest, researchers climbed giant trees, investigated nest hollows, captured and tagged young macaws and collected blood samples and feathers for genetic analysis. But doing serious scientific work in the Amazon is not an easy feat. Jaguars visit the camp, wasps attack the climbers and parasites hunt and bite every free piece of skin. Despite all the challenges the team returns to the lab with the invaluable samples that can help us understand the status of an isolated parrot population.

Popular Science Edition 
After years of preparation, zoologist George Olah finally got what he wanted. A special permission from the government of Peru. The 50+ page document gave him access to the Holy Grail of parrot researchers: the Candamo Basin, in the Peruvian Amazon. A place where wildlife exists without any human disturbance since the beginning of times. Surrounded by the foothills of the Andes, the Candamo Basin hosts one of the very few uninhabited tropical rainforest of the world. Not even native tribes had settled here and decades had passed since the last camera team dared to sail the hostile rapids of the Candamo river.

Rhinos in the Freezer (2018) 
Rhinos are in a retreat. In their constant battle with mankind and changing climate, these prehistoric giants keep losing. From Europe they vanished thousands of years ago, with nothing but faint cave paintings remaining in their wake. In Asia a handful of them are roaming the last fragments of the rainforest. In Africa their survivors are forced behind electric fences, guarded by heavily armed rangers. On the black market the price of rhino horn is skyrocketing. The result is a massive wave of poaching, sweeping through the entire world. Europol issued a warning that organized crime gangs started to steal rhino horns from museums and private collections. Rhinos are wanted around the world. Dead or alive. Still, there is a place where they can find a safe shelter. And that place is in the freezer…

The Macaw Project (2016) 
A long-term scientific research project has been implemented in the Tambopata Research Center. Here in the Peruvian Amazon, biologists, veterinarians, and geneticists work tirelessly to study the enigmatic macaws in their natural habitat. The acquired knowledge helps them to maintain the species and protect this biodiversity hotspot from human intruders: the gold miners. However, scientific approach alone was not enough to protect the area. A clever, economic solution was needed, offering alternative incentives to local people to keep these forests standing: eco-tourism. The Macaw Project gives a glimpse to the everyday work of the researchers, while also explains cutting-edge techniques with novel findings in a comprehensible way. It reveals information about the tropical rainforest ecosystem based on hard scientific evidence. This scientific documentary presents a sustainable and internationally applicable model for biodiversity conservation, incorporating scientific research and eco-tourism with strong involvement of the local communities.

References

External links
 Website of The Macaw Project documentary
 Website of The Macaw Kingdom documentary
 Website of Rhinos in the Freezer documentary
 Website of The Indonesian Parrot Project documentary

501(c)(3) organizations
Environmental organizations based in Virginia